St. Andrew's is a 10th-century Romanesque church located in the old town of Cologne, Germany. It is one of twelve churches built in Cologne in that period.
Archbishop Gero consecrated the church in 974, dedicating it to St. Andrew, although an earlier church at the site was dedicated to St. Matthew. In the 12th century, the church was rebuilt in the Romanesque style, and was probably completed after the great fire of Cologne in 1220.
In the crypt of the church lies a Roman sarcophagus from the 3rd century, which holds the remains of the 13th-century theologian and natural philosopher St. Albertus Magnus. Since 1947, the Dominican Order has ministered to the church.

See also 
 Cologne Cathedral 
 German architecture
 List of regional characteristics of Romanesque churches
 Romanesque architecture
 Romanesque secular and domestic architecture
 Twelve Romanesque churches of Cologne

References

External links 
 
  

Innenstadt, Cologne
Romanesque architecture in Germany
Roman Catholic churches in Cologne
10th-century churches in Germany
974 establishments
Dominican churches
Order of the Holy Sepulchre
10th-century establishments in Germany